The Baiyue (Mandarin: 臺灣百岳; Pīnyīn: Táiwān bǎiyuè) is a list of one hundred mountain peaks in Taiwan. They were chosen by a group of prominent Taiwanese hikers from mountain peaks known at the time to be over 3,000 meters  in height.  The selection criteria included uniqueness, danger, height, beauty and prominence.  Preference was also given to peaks already named and those with triangulation points. As such, "Top" does not refer strictly to the highest peaks by elevation, but rather peaks most worth hiking. The list was intended to promote enthusiasm for high-altitude hiking in Taiwan. In the resulting list of one hundred peaks, 69 peaks were in the Central Mountain Range, the largest of Taiwan's five principal mountain ranges, while 19 were in the Xueshan Range, and 12 were in the Yushan Range. The Alishan Range and Coastal Mountain Range, being below 3,000m, have no peaks in the list of Baiyue.

History 
Taiwan has one of the highest densities of tall mountains in the world. To promote mountain hiking, the Taiwan Alpine Association began developing a list of top 100 peaks for Taiwan. Wen-An Lin, after a 1971 crossing of the Central Mountain Range, set about drawing up the list. After extensive consultation with Ching-Chang Tsai, Tian-Cheng Hsing, Tung-San Ting and other prominent hikers of the day, the list of Baiyue was finalized.

Upon completion of the list, hiking the Baiyue immediately became one of the primary goals of avid hikers in Taiwan. Finishing the Baiyue is no easy task, however. For aspiring Baiyue hikers, the Five Greats, Three Spires, and One Ogre, whose unique beauty best represents the grandeur of Taiwan's high mountains, became a popular starting point. Other popular sets of peaks include the Harsh Ten and Four Beauties. Many begin with the more easily accessible peaks in the Hehuanshan area.

There are actually over 260 mountain peaks over 3,000 meters in Taiwan, many of which were not listed in the Baiyue, but nonetheless impressive.  Therefore, some criticism remains over the inclusion of certain mountain peaks on the list, and the exclusion of others, such as Chushan in the Dongjunshan Chain, and Mutelebushan near Xueshan's North Peak. Some have argued that these peaks should be in the Baiyue, while peaks such as Jupenshan, Lushan, Nanhubeishan, Shenmazhenshan, Jianshan, and Bulakesangshan, should be taken off the list. Also, when resurveying was carried out long after the Baiyue list was completed, it was found that Liushunshan and Lushan were under 3,000m. However, as the Baiyue already enjoyed such widespread acceptance, they were not removed from the list and remain there to this day.

Complete listing of Baiyue
The following is a complete listing of the 100 Taiwanese mountain peaks commonly known as the Baiyue:

Notes

Designated lists

Alternative names and other remarks

References 

Mountains of Taiwan
Taiwan geography-related lists
Mountaineering in Taiwan